Xinghua Subdistrict is a subdistrict of Tianhe District, Guangzhou, People's Republic of China. , it has two residential communities under its administration. Yantang Station on Line 3 of the Guangzhou Metro is located nearby.

See also
List of township-level divisions of Guangdong

References

Township-level divisions of Guangdong
Tianhe District
Subdistricts of the People's Republic of China